Ting Zhu may refer to:
Jasmine (Taiwanese singer) (born 1981), Taiwanese singer whose stage name in pinyin is Tíng Zhú
Zhu Ting (footballer) (born 1985), Chinese footballer
Zhu Ting (volleyball) (born 1994), Chinese women's volleyball player